The following is a comparative list of smartphones belonging to smartphones in the Samsung Galaxy S series line of devices, using the Android operating system. This table is primarily intended to show the differences between the model families of phones in the Galaxy S series. The list only covers unlocked and international devices.

Galaxy S

Galaxy S2

Galaxy S3

Galaxy S4

Galaxy S5

Galaxy S6

Galaxy S7

Galaxy S8

Galaxy S9

Galaxy S10

Galaxy S20

Galaxy S21

Galaxy S22

Galaxy S23

References for comparison table

See also 
 Comparison of Samsung Galaxy Note smartphones
 Comparison of smartphones

References 

Galaxy S Series
Galaxy S Series
Android (operating system) devices
Samsung Galaxy S
Samsung Galaxy S smartphones